Adeka is the first pharmaceutical company established in Anatolia, headquartered in Samsun.

It was founded in 1956 in Samsun with five partners. It takes its name from the first letters of the surnames of its founding partners. In 2006, its 50th anniversary celebrated in Çırağan Palace.

References 

Pharmaceutical companies established in 1956
1956 establishments in Turkey